Satan Is Real Again, or Feeling Good About Bad Thoughts, released in 1996, is the second album by Country Teasers.

Track listing 
All songs written by B.R. Wallers except where noted

Side one
"The Wide-Open Beaver of Nashville" – 2:16
"Black Change" – 1:30
"Panty Shots" – 4:32
"It Is My Duty" – 6:53
"Devil on My Back" – 1:20
"Little Black Clouds" – 2:55
"Lies" – 3:21

Side two
"Thank You God for Making Me an Angel" (Wallers/Joy Division) – 2:38
"Cripples" – 2:30
"Some Hole" – 2:12 
"Don't Like People" – 3:09  
"Country Fag" – 1:41
"Satan Is Real Again" – 4:46
"These Things Shall Pass" (Stuart Hamblen) – 2:58

Trivia
The track "Thank You God for Making Me an Angel" is largely based on the Joy Division track "Digital"

Personnel
B. R. Wallers - Singing & Guitar
Alan. K. Crichton - Guitars
Simon W. Stephens - Bass
Eck King - Drums
Richard Greenan - Guitar
Mark Deas - Production (10 & 12)
John Morgan - Guitar (10)

References

1996 albums
Country Teasers albums
Crypt Records albums